Wat Bot City Football Club (Thai สโมสรฟุตบอลวัดโบสถ์ ซิตี้) is a semi professional football club based in Phitsanulok, Thailand. The club is currently playing in the Thai League 3 Northern region.

History
In 2018, the club has established by a football fan in Wat Bot, Phitsanulok and competed in Thailand Amateur League Northern region. In the end of season, the club has promoted to Thai League 4 (also known as Omsin League).

In 2019, The club has moved their ground to the Pibulsongkram Rajabhat University Stadium. They competed in Thai League 4 Northern region and finished in the 2nd place, qualified to the champions league stage. The club is planning to construct an own stadium in Wat Bot, Phitsanulok. In the end of 2019 season, Wat Bot City has promoted to 2020 Thai League 3 by competed in the upper region. In addition, at the end of 2019 season, Wat Bot City was the champion of Thai League 4 Champions League.

Stadium and locations

Season by season record

P = Played
W = Games won
D = Games drawn
L = Games lost
F = Goals for
A = Goals against
Pts = Points
Pos = Final position

QR1 = First Qualifying Round
QR2 = Second Qualifying Round
R1 = Round 1
R2 = Round 2
R3 = Round 3
R4 = Round 4

R5 = Round 5
R6 = Round 6
QF = Quarter-finals
SF = Semi-finals
RU = Runners-up
W = Winners

Player

Current players

Club officials

Honours

Domestic leagues
 Thai League 4
 Champions (1): 2019

References

External links
 Official facebook

Association football clubs established in 2018
Football clubs in Thailand
Phitsanulok province
2018 establishments in Thailand